Club Necaxa is a Mexican football club.

Necaxa may also refer to:
Club Necaxa (women), the female division
Necaxa River, Mexico
C.D. Necaxa, a Honduran football club 
Necaxa (Mexico City Metrobús), a BRT station in Mexico City